Zsombor Nagy (born 21 March 1998) is a Hungarian professional footballer who plays for MTK Budapest FC.

Career statistics

.

References

1998 births
Living people
People from Szeged
Hungarian footballers
Association football defenders
Dorogi FC footballers
MTK Budapest FC players
Nemzeti Bajnokság I players